The women's 800 metre freestyle event at the 2015 European Games took place on 23 June at the Aquatic Palace in Baku.

Results
The heats were started at 12:14 and 19:12.

References

Women's 800 metre freestyle
2015 in women's swimming